Common Sense on Mutual Funds: New Imperatives for the Intelligent Investor, written by John Bogle, is a book advising investors about mutual funds, with a focus on the praise of index funds and the importance of having a long-term strategy.  
On the dust jacket cover, Jim Cramer wrote, "After a lifetime of picking stocks, I have to admit that (Vanguard Group founder John) Bogle's arguments in favor of the index fund have me thinking of joining him rather than trying to beat him."

Since its release, it has received high accolades in the investment community.  
It has become a bestseller and is considered a "classic".  
ConsumerAffairs.com rated it on its "15 Business Books That Could Actually Help Make You Rich" list.  
Despite it being aimed at American audiences, the British newspaper The Independent stated "there is nothing in it that does not apply in some measure to the UK fund industry."

See also
Burton Malkiel's A Random Walk Down Wall Street

References

1999 non-fiction books
American non-fiction books
Finance books